Acaena is a genus of about 60 species of mainly evergreen, creeping herbaceous perennial plants and subshrubs in the family Rosaceae, native mainly to the Southern Hemisphere, notably New Zealand, Australia and South America, but with a few species extending into the Northern Hemisphere, north to Hawaii (A. exigua) and California (A. pinnatifida).

The flowers are produced in a tight globose [inflorescence]  in diameter, with no petals. The fruit is also a dense ball of many seeds; in many (but not all) species the seeds bear a barbed arrowhead point, the seedhead forming a burr which attaches itself to animal fur or feathers for dispersal.

Several Acaena species in New Zealand are known by the common name bidibid. The word is written variously bidi-bidi, biddy-biddy, biddi-biddi, biddi-bid and a number of other variations. These names are the English rendition of the original Māori name of piripiri. The plant is also called the New Zealand burr.  The species Acaena microphylla has gained the Royal Horticultural Society's Award of Garden Merit.

Etymology 
The generic name Acaena is derived from the Greek "akaina" (thorn), referring to the spiny hypanthium.

Species
, Plants of the World Online accepted the following species:

Acaena agnipila 
Acaena alpina 
Acaena anserinifolia 
Acaena antarctica 
Acaena argentea 
Acaena boliviana 
Acaena buchananii 
Acaena caesiiglauca  – glaucous pirri-pirri-bur
Acaena caespitosa 
Acaena confertissima 
Acaena cylindristachya 
Acaena dumicola  (South Island of New Zealand)
Acaena echinata  – sheep's burr
Acaena elongata 
Acaena emittens  (North Island of New Zealand)
Acaena eupatoria 
Acaena exigua  – liliwai (Hawaii)
Acaena fissistipula 
Acaena fuscescens 
Acaena glabra 
Acaena hirsutula 
Acaena inermis 
Acaena integerrima 
Acaena juvenca  (New Zealand)
Acaena latebrosa 
Acaena leptacantha 
Acaena longiscapa 
Acaena lucida 
Acaena macrocephala 
Acaena magellanica  – greater burnet
Acaena masafuerana 
Acaena microphylla  – New Zealand-bur
Acaena minor 
Acaena montana 
Acaena myriophylla 
Acaena novae-zelandiae  – red bidibid (New Zealand)
Acaena ovalifolia 
Acaena ovina 
Acaena pallida  – sand bidibid
Acaena patagonica 
Acaena pinnatifida  – Argentinian biddy-biddy
Acaena platyacantha 
Acaena poeppigiana 
Acaena profundeincisa 
Acaena pumila 
Acaena rorida  (North Island)
Acaena saccaticupula 
Acaena sarmentosa 
Acaena sericea 
Acaena splendens 
Acaena stangii 
Acaena stricta 
Acaena subincisa 
Acaena tenera  – lesser burnet
Acaena tesca  (South Island)
Acaena torilicarpa 
Acaena trifida

Invasive species
Some species have been introduced accidentally to other areas, attached to sheep's wool, and have become invasive species. Acaena novae-zelandiae, one of the bidibids from New Zealand, is the most commonly encountered species in the United Kingdom, where it is often abundant on coastal sand dunes, crowding out native vegetation and creating an often painful nuisance with the barbed burrs. In California, A. pallida, A. novae-zelandiae and A. anserinifolia are considered serious weeds.

References

External links

Jepson Manual Treatment
USDA Plants Profile
Landcare Research New Zealand

 
Pantropical flora
Rosaceae genera